USS Mingo or Mingoe may refer to the following vessels of the United States Navy:

 , a stern-wheel steamer, which was purchased by and served in the Union Navy during the American Civil War
 , was a side‑wheel steam gunboat launched 6 August 1863 and sold 3 October 1867
 , was a Gato-class submarine which served from 1943 until 1947

United States Navy ship names